Marckolsheim is a commune in the Bas-Rhin department in Alsace in north-eastern France.

On the eastern edge of the town the Casemate de Marckolsheim Sud, a Maginot Line fortification left over from the Second World War, has been converted into a small museum.   Approximately 3 kilometres to the east the Rhine has been dammed and a hydro-electric power station installed.

Gallery

See also
 Communes of the Bas-Rhin department

References

Communes of Bas-Rhin
Bas-Rhin communes articles needing translation from French Wikipedia